Plaxico Antonio Burress (born August 12, 1977) is a former American football wide receiver who played 12 seasons in the National Football League (NFL). He played college football at Michigan State, and was drafted by the Pittsburgh Steelers eighth overall in the 2000 NFL Draft. He also played for the New York Giants and the New York Jets, and caught the game-winning touchdown in Super Bowl XLII as the Giants beat the then-undefeated New England Patriots.

Personal life
Plaxico Burress was born to Vicki Burress in Norfolk, Virginia. He was named after his uncle, has two brothers, and has been married to Tiffany Glenn since July 2005. They have one son, Elijah and a daughter, Giovanna, born November 2009. Burress graduated from Green Run High School in Virginia Beach, Virginia in 1996 and spent a post-graduate year at Fork Union Military Academy in Fork Union, Virginia. He lives in Totowa, New Jersey.

College career
Burress set a Big Ten Conference single-season record by catching 65 passes in his first season at Michigan State, and also excelled on the special-teams coverage units, using his leaping ability as a kick blocker.

He ranks third in career touchdown catches (20), third in receptions (131), and fourth in receiving yards (2,155) in just two seasons at Michigan State University. He was an All-American second-team selection by SportsPage.com and an All-Big Ten Conference first-team pick in 1999. Burress broke the school season-record he set in 1998 (65 catches) with 66 receptions for 1,142 yards (17.3 avg) and 12 touchdowns. He set a Spartans' single-season-record 12 touchdown receptions, eclipsing the previous record of eight Burress shared (1998) with Andre Rison (1988) and Bob Carey (1949). He forced two fumbles, recovered another, and registered seven tackles (five solos) on special teams.

Burress set a school record with 255 yards receiving on ten catches against the University of Michigan. He ended his career with a school-record 13 receptions for 185 yards and three touchdowns against the University of Florida in the 2000 Citrus Bowl.

He also broke the single-game record of 12 receptions set by tight end Mitch Lyons in 1992. In 1996, he caught 33 passes for 807 yards (24.5 avg.) and 12 touchdowns. Burress was an All-Big Ten Conference first-team selection in 1998 by The Sports Network, and he earned second-team accolades from the league's media. He shared Spartan Outstanding Underclass Back Award honors with tailback Sedrick Irvin and wide receiver Gari Scott. Also, he started All Year at split end and set a school season-record with 65 receptions, topping the previous mark of 60 catches by Courtney Hawkins in 1989. He had more than 100 yards receiving in four games and was ranked third in the conference with an average of 84.4 yards per game and fifth in the conference with an average of 5.4 catches per game. He recorded six solo tackles and forced a fumble on special teams.

Professional career

2000 NFL Combine

Pittsburgh Steelers
After being drafted in the first round with the eighth overall pick in the 2000 NFL Draft, Burress went on to play five years with the Pittsburgh Steelers, amassing 261 receptions for 4,164 yards, 22 touchdowns, and six fumbles over the span of 71 games. Burress was featured on the MTV show True Life, documenting his rookie season. His rookie season saw him on the wrong end on one of the NFL's most infamous gaffes.

In a game the Steelers eventually won 24–13, Burress caught a 19-yard reception, with his momentum causing him to fall to his knees. The rookie Burress then spiked the ball, believing the play was dead (since that is the rule in the NCAA but not the NFL) but, since he was not touched while he was on the ground, the ball was still live—allowing the Jaguars' Danny Clark to recover the fumble and run 44 yards with it.

He first broke the 1,000-yard mark in his second season, gaining 1,008 yards on 66 receptions. Burress's best season with the Steelers came in 2002, when he set his career highs for receptions (78) and yards (1,325), to go along with seven touchdowns. Also in 2002, Burress played in his first career playoff game, accumulating six receptions for 100 yards and a touchdown. In three subsequent playoff games with the Steelers, Burress totaled only seven receptions, 123 yards, and one touchdown.

Burress's 1,008-yard season in 2001, combined with Hines Ward's 1,003 receiving yards, gave the Steelers their first pair of 1,000-yard receivers. The two would combine to accomplish the same feat in 2002. On November 10, 2002, Burress took advantage of an extra 15 minutes of play to set a Steelers' franchise record with 253 receiving yards in a 34–34 tie against the Atlanta Falcons. He caught nine passes and scored two touchdowns in the game, and nearly won it but was stopped at the 1-yard line as time expired.

New York Giants

On January 23, 2005, after a playoff defeat, Burress announced his intentions to leave the Steelers. On March 17, he signed a six-year, $25 million contract with the New York Giants.

In his first season with the Giants, Burress caught 76 passes for 1,214 yards, helping the team earn an 11–5 record and first place in the NFC East as well as the NFC's fourth seed. However, they were shut out 23–0 by the Carolina Panthers in the opening round of the 2005–06 NFL playoffs.

In the 2006 season, Burress managed a career-high ten touchdowns but fell short of the 1,000-yard mark, appearing in only 15 games and struggling with a groin injury for much of the year. The Giants lost six of their last eight games and fell in the NFC Wild Card playoffs to the NFC East champion Philadelphia Eagles 23–20. Burress had a touchdown catch on the opening drive and finished the game with five receptions for 89 yards and two touchdowns.

In 2007, Burress was the Giants' top receiver with 70 receptions for 1,025 yards, despite not practicing all season because of his ailing ankle. He also set a franchise playoff record in the NFC title game in Green Bay with 11 receptions for 154 yards as the Giants advanced to Super Bowl XLII.

In Super Bowl XLII, Burress caught the game-winning touchdown pass that made the score 17–14 in the Giants' favor over the undefeated (18–0) New England Patriots. He gained a measure of "Super Bowl legend" by predicting the Patriots would lose by the score 23–17.

Before their May mini-camp, Burress and his teammates were invited by then-President George W. Bush to the White House on April 30, 2008 to honor their victory in Super Bowl XLII.

Just before the start of the Giants' mandatory May mini-camp, Burress had said that he would not participate in the camp because he was upset with his contract. He attended the camp to avoid paying a fine but refused to practice with the team. Although he was slated to receive $3.25 million for 2008, Burress felt underpaid compared to other star receivers. After indicating that he might hold out training camp as well, he joined, but practiced very little, claiming his ankle was injured.

In September 2008, Burress did not show up for work on a Monday and could not be reached by phone for two days. On September 24, 2008, the team announced that Burress would be suspended for the game on October 5 for a violation of team rules.

This was not the first time that Burress had been temporarily suspended by an NFL team—in May 2004, he was suspended by the Pittsburgh Steelers for failing to show up for a Monday team practice. On October 24 he was issued four fines totaling $60,000 for the following reasons:

 $20,000 for post-game comments regarding officiating—specifically, inappropriate comments on officiating.
 $20,000 for unsportsmanlike conduct—specifically, verbal abuse of the head linesman.
 $5,000 for throwing the ball in the stands.
 $15,000 for slapping a referee in the face.

Burress signed a five-year, $35 million contract extension prior to the season. However, it was an incentive-laced deal, with $11.5 million in non-guaranteed base salaries in the contract, non-guaranteed roster bonuses of $3.5 million, non-guaranteed escalators of $5 million based on performance and $1.3 million in non-guaranteed workout bonuses among other things. According to various reports, the Giants would be able to cut or trade Burress after the season and get $23 million taken off their books.

On November 2, in the second quarter of the Giants' ninth regular-season game against the Dallas Cowboys, Burress caught his 500th career reception. On November 23, 2008, Burress started the game against the Arizona Cardinals in Arizona after being considered questionable with a hamstring injury. The first play of the game he had a 4-yard reception but it was called back on a penalty. Burress left the game and did not return in what would be his final appearance with the Giants.

Burress was released by the Giants on April 3, 2009, when it was apparent his accidental shooting court case would take longer than expected to resolve.

New York Jets
Burress agreed to a one-year contract worth approximately $3.017 million guaranteed with the New York Jets on July 31, 2011, after turning down a two-year deal from the Pittsburgh Steelers that was rumored to be valued at a little more than the Jets offer but without as much guaranteed money. In his first game back in New York at MetLife Stadium in a pre-season matchup against the Cincinnati Bengals, Burress caught a pass from Mark Sanchez on the first play of the Jets' first drive, and in the second quarter caught a touchdown pass. On October 23, 2011, in a game against the San Diego Chargers Burress caught three touchdown passes from Sanchez, tying a game career high.

Second stint with the Pittsburgh Steelers
Burress re-signed with the Steelers on November 20, 2012, after injuries sustained by Jerricho Cotchery and Antonio Brown. On December 30, 2012, Burress caught a 12-yard touchdown pass from quarterback Ben Roethlisberger. Burress had not caught a touchdown from Roethlisberger since 2004. On March 12, 2013, Burress signed a one-year deal to stay with the Steelers. He suffered a torn rotator cuff during a practice on August 8; on August 13, Burress was placed on the injured reserve list by the Steelers.

NFL career statistics

Coaching career

Arizona Cardinals
On July 22, 2017, Burress was hired by the Arizona Cardinals as a coaching intern.

Legal troubles
In August and September 2008, Totowa police responded to two domestic disturbance calls at the Burress residence. At both times temporary restraining orders were issued that were later dismissed by the New Jersey state court.

Accidental shooting
On November 28, 2008, Burress suffered an accidental, self-inflicted gunshot wound to his right thigh at the nightclub LQ on Lexington Avenue in New York City when his Glock pistol in the pocket of his jeans began sliding down his leg; apparently in reaching for his gun, he inadvertently pressed the trigger, causing the gun to fire. The injury was not life-threatening and Burress was released from an area hospital the next afternoon. Two days later, Burress turned himself in to police to face charges of criminal possession of a handgun. It was later discovered that New York City police only learned about the incident after seeing it on television and were not called by NewYork–Presbyterian Hospital as required by law. New York Mayor Michael Bloomberg called the hospital actions an "outrage" and stated that they are a "chargeable offense". Bloomberg also urged that Burress be prosecuted to the fullest extent of the law, saying that any punishment short of the minimum 3 1/2 years for unlawful carrying of a handgun would be "a mockery of the law." Burress had an expired concealed carry license from Florida, but no New York license.

On December 2, 2008, Burress posted bail of $100,000. Later in the day, Burress reported to Giants Stadium as per team policy for injured but active players and was told he would be suspended without pay for the remaining four games of the 2008 regular season for conduct detrimental to the team. In addition, the Giants placed Burress on their reserve/non-football injury list, meaning he was ineligible to return for the playoffs. Burress was also scheduled to receive $1 million from his signing bonus on December 10, 2008, initially withheld by the team. The NFL Players Association filed a grievance, saying the team violated the collective bargaining agreement and challenging the suspension and fine received by Burress. A Special Master in arbitration subsequently ruled that the Giants must deliver the entire $1 million to Burress, as per the collective bargaining agreement. "To think that a player could carry a loaded gun into a nightclub, shoot himself and miss the rest of the season but get to keep his entire signing bonus illustrates one of the serious flaws in the current system," said Giants co-owner John Mara in a statement afterward.

On December 23, 2008, a search of Burress's New Jersey home by the Totowa, New Jersey police, the New York Police Department, and investigators from the Manhattan District Attorney turned up a 9 mm handgun, a rifle, ammunition, and the clothing believed to have been worn by Burress on the night of his shooting. On June 12, 2009, Burress's attorney Benjamin Brafman announced that he had been unable to reach a sentencing agreement.

Burress asked a Manhattan grand jury for sympathy during two hours of testimony on July 29, 2009. On Monday, August 3, 2009, prosecutors announced that Burress had been indicted by the grand jury on two felony counts of criminal possession of a weapon in the second degree, and a single count of reckless endangerment in the second degree, a misdemeanor.

On August 20, 2009, Burress accepted a plea deal that would put him in prison for two years with an additional two years of supervised release. His sentencing was held on September 22, 2009. Burress hired a prison consultant to advise him on what to expect while in prison. In January 2010, Burress applied for and was denied a work release from prison. On June 6, 2011, Burress was released from a protective custody unit of the Oneida Correctional Facility in Rome, New York, having served 20 months.

Civil lawsuits
Burress had a civil lawsuit, filed on December 8, 2008, in Broward County, Florida, in which Alise Smith claimed that Burress's $140,000 Mercedes-Benz collided with the back of her car. The suit claimed that Burress was liable for causing permanent injuries to Smith. Burress's car insurance policy had been cancelled three days before the accident due to nonpayment of the premium. In 2012, he was ordered to pay Smith $159,000, which he eventually did by May 2013 after a judge had ordered the sale of his mansion in Virginia Beach.

In January 2010, Burress was the defendant in a civil lawsuit brought against him by a Lebanon County, Pennsylvania car dealer, who claimed that Burress was given a leased Chevrolet Avalanche in return for promises to appear at publicity events for the dealership. The dealer claimed that Burress never returned the car and never attended any publicity events; the damaged car was eventually returned after being impounded by the New York Police Department. Burress acknowledged that he was responsible for some of the damage to the car, but asked a jury to determine the amount. On January 15, 2009, the jury returned a verdict awarding only $1,700 to the dealer, who had asked for damages of up to $19,000. According to the Associated Press, Burress has been sued at least nine times since he joined the NFL in 2000.

Tax indictment

On April 30, 2015, Burress was indicted by the State of New Jersey on charges that he failed to pay nearly $48,000 in income taxes. Burress filed his 2013 state income tax return on October 20, 2014, for which he submitted an electronic transfer. According to the State Division of Taxation, the transfer failed to go through. Burress was notified multiple times in an attempt to collect the tax debt, including via certified mail, but never responded. The indictment made him the first person in New Jersey to be charged under a new state law which treats bad electronic money transfers as a criminal offense, equivalent to writing bad checks.

On December 7, 2015, Burress entered into a plea agreement in a hearing at Mercer County Superior Court, admitting guilt in failure to pay $46,000 in taxes on his 2013 tax return (a year in which he earned $1 million in income.) Burress faced up to 5 years' probation at his February 5, 2016 sentencing hearing. He received a conditional 364-day jail sentence, was placed on probation for five years, and ordered to repay $56,000 in penalties and restitution to the state by Judge Pedro Jimenez in Mercer County Superior Court. He will not go to jail if he follows his conditions of probation. Although he avoided prison time by pleading guilty, failure to pay the amount in full by the conclusion of his probation could result in Burress's incarceration.

Other ventures
Burress, co-wrote the book Giant: The Road to the Super Bowl, published July 1, 2008 by It Books, about his Super Bowl experience.

Burress appeared on Celebrity Wife Swap on July 29, 2014. Burress joined SportsNet, New York's SportsNite, making his debut as an NFL analyst on Sunday September 7, 2014.

References

External links

 
 Plaxico Burress Arrest

1977 births
Living people
21st-century American criminals
African-American players of American football
American football wide receivers
American male criminals
American prisoners and detainees
American shooting survivors
American sportspeople convicted of crimes
Criminals from New Jersey
Criminals from Virginia
Michigan State Spartans football players
New York Giants players
New York Jets players
People from Totowa, New Jersey
Pittsburgh Steelers players
Players of American football from New Jersey
Players of American football from Norfolk, Virginia
Prisoners and detainees of New York (state)
Sportspeople from Virginia Beach, Virginia